The 1983 Virginia Slims of Chicago was a women's tennis tournament played on indoor carpet courts at the International Amphitheatre in Chicago, Illinois in the United States that was part of the 1983 Virginia Slims World Championship Series. It was the 12th edition of the tournament and was held from February 14 through February 20, 1983. First-seeded Martina Navratilova won the singles title and earned $30,000 first-prize money.

Finals

Singles

 Martina Navratilova defeated  Andrea Jaeger 6–3, 6–2
 It was Navratilova's 3rd singles title of the year and the 73rd of her career.

Doubles

 Martina Navratilova /  Pam Shriver defeated  Kathy Jordan /  Anne Smith 6–1, 6–2
 It was Navratilova's 6th title of the year and the 153rd of her career. It was Shriver's 3rd title of the year and the 37th of her career.

Prize money

References

External links
 International Tennis Federation (ITF) tournament edition details
 Tournament draws

Virginia Slims of Chicago
Ameritech Cup
1983 in sports in Illinois
February 1983 sports events in the United States
Avon